Cimitarra Airport  is an airport serving the town of Cimitarra in the Santander Department of Colombia.

See also

Transport in Colombia
List of airports in Colombia

References

External links
OurAirports - Cimitarra
SkyVector - Cimitarra
FallingRain - Cimitarra Airport

Airports in Colombia